The Open Road: The Global Journey of the Fourteenth Dalai Lama is a 2008 book by Pico Iyer.

The Dalai Lama calls himself "a simple Buddhist monk", but he is also a public figure who frequents religious gatherings and official meetings. He is also a politician on the global stage. The book is an attempt to capture some of the conversations that the author has had with the Dalai Lama.

References

2008 non-fiction books
2008 in religion